Green Door is a 2019 Taiwanese horror thriller drama television miniseries directed and co-written by Lingo Hsieh, based on the novel of the same name by Joseph Chen. The miniseries stars Jam Hsiao, Kuo Bea-ting, Enno Cheng, and Hsieh Ying-xuan. It follows a troubled psychologist who returns from the United States to set up a psychology clinic called Green Door in Taiwan, where mysterious patients and uncanny events shed light on his murky past.

Cast
 Jam Hsiao as Wei Sung-yen
 Bea Hayden as Hung Yu-mei
 Enno Cheng as Liu Zao-yun
 Wan-Ru Zhan as Mary
 Hsieh Ying-hsuan as Yu Hsiu-chi
 Yi-Ting Wu as Elly
 Hai-Yung Shen as Chang Li-hua
 Ya-yun Lan as Doris
 Wei-Hua Lan as Shen Jin-fa
 Kurt Chou as Major
 Chiang Ting as Grandpa Chu
 Yueh-hsin Chu as Master Hsu-kung
 Yu-Chieh Cheng as Chen Hao-chieh

Release
Green Door premiered on PTS on February 16, 2019, and concluded on March 16, 2019, consisting of six episodes.

Netflix picked up global streaming rights to the series and released it on March 16, 2019.

Awards and nominations

References

External links
  
 
 

2019 Taiwanese television series debuts
2019 Taiwanese television series endings
2010s drama television series
2010s horror television series
2010s mystery television series
2010s supernatural television series
2010s television miniseries
Horror drama television series
Psychological thriller television series
Mandarin-language television shows
Taiwanese drama television series
Taiwanese mystery television series
Taiwanese thriller television series
Television series about ghosts
Television series based on novels
Television shows about death
Television shows about spirit possession
Works about psychology
Public Television Service original programming